Andreas Charalambous (born 26 July 2001) is a Cypriot sports shooter. He competed in the 10m Air Rifle event at the 2019 Games of the Small States of Europe, where he took the silver medal.

External links

References

2001 births
Living people
Cypriot male sport shooters
Sportspeople from Limassol